František Cejnar (1917 – 3 May 1965) was a Czechoslovak amateur tennis player in the 1930s.

Tennis career
Cejnar reached the quarterfinals of the French Open in 1937 and 1938 and Wimbledon in 1938.

References

External links
 
 
 
 

1917 births
1965 deaths
Czech male tennis players
Czechoslovak male tennis players
Tennis players from Prague
Date of birth missing